Central High School is a public high school in Independence, Oregon, United States.

Academics

In 2005–2006, Central High School was rated "satisfactory" by the Oregon Department of Education.

In 2008, 73% of the school's seniors received a high school diploma. Of 185 students, 135 graduated, 21 dropped out, 14 received a modified diploma, and 15 were still in high school the following year.
In 2019, 82% of students graduated on time, and 78% of 9th graders were on track to graduate.

Extracurriculars 
In 2019, the Central Cheerleaders won first place in the United Spirits Association National Championship for varsity show cheer novice non-tumbling.
The school has 3 choirs and 3 bands. The sports programs are football, wrestling, girls' basketball, boys' basketball, cross country, cheerleading, boys' soccer, girls' soccer, volleyball, tennis, golf, baseball, softball, and track and field. There is also a large theater program.

Notable faculty 
 Greg Craven, climate change activist
Benjamin Gorman, author

Notable alumni
 Jasmine Ash, pop artist and singer/keyboardist for Oh Darling
 Shelley Beattie, professional bodybuilder and actress
 Jeff Charleston, defensive end for the New Orleans Saints of the NFL and member of the team's 2010 Super Bowl roster.  
 Grant Hedrick (class of 2009), Former Boise State Quarterback, Was the Starting Quarterback for Boise State in the 2014 season, he helped Boise State win the 2014 Fiesta bowl vs Arizona and is now teaching at Oregon City High School where he is also the offensive coordinator for the varsity football team.
 Greg Nibler, actor, musician, radio personality
 Patrick Page (class of 1980), stage actor; played the Green Goblin in Spider-Man: Turn Off the Dark on Broadway
 Marlon Tuipulotu, defensive lineman for the Philadelphia Eagles of the NFL and member of the team's 2023 Super Bowl roster.

References

External links
 Central High School

High schools in Polk County, Oregon
Monmouth, Oregon
Educational institutions established in 1950
Public high schools in Oregon
1950 establishments in Oregon
Independence, Oregon